Vasile Vasilache (4 July 1926 – 7 July 2008) was a writer from Moldova.

Vasile Vasilache was born to Ion and Elizabeta Vasilache on July 4, 1926, in Unţeşti. In 1965 he became a member of the Moldovan Writers' Union. Vasile Vasilache died on July 7, 2008 and has been buried in the Central Cemetery on Armeneasca street in Chişinău.

 the writer Serafim Saca said in tears at Vasilache's funeral. The Moldovan Writers' Union president Mihai Cimpoi has said that Vasile Vasilache has left a wide gap in Moldova's culture.

Awards
 Order of the Republic (Moldova) (1996), highest state distinction
 „Insigna de Onoare” (1986)
 Premiul Naţional pentru literatură (1994),
 „Opera Omnia” al Uniunii Scriitorilor din Moldova.
 Premiat pentru scenariul documentar "Eu şi ceilalti...", Riga, 1969

Works
 Trişca” (1961),
 „Două mere ţigance” (1964),
 „Tăcerile casei aceleia” (1970),
 „Elegie pentru Ana-Maria” (1983),
 „Mama-mare, profesoară de istorie” (1989),
 „Navetista şi pădurea” (1989),
 „Surâsul lui Vişnu” (1993)
 „Povestea cu cocoşul roşu” (1996),

References

External links 
 Ion Ciocanu, VASILE VASILACHE - un adevărat fenomen în literatura basarabeană, Literatura română contemporană din Republica Moldova, Editira Litera, Chişinău, 1998.
 IN MEMORIAM
 Vasile Vasilache a fost condus pe ultimul drum
 
 Vasile Vasilache. 4 iulie 1926 - 7 iulie 2008
 Vasile VASILACHE

1926 births
2008 deaths
People from Ungheni District
Eastern Orthodox Christians from Moldova
Moldovan writers
Moldovan male writers
Romanian writers
Alexandru Ioan Cuza University alumni
Recipients of the Order of the Republic (Moldova)